This is a list of notable jazz institutions and organizations.

A 
Alabama Jazz Hall of Fame, Birmingham, Alabama
American Jazz Museum, Kansas City, Missouri
Association for the Advancement of Creative Musicians, Chicago, Illinois

B 
Ben Webster Foundation, Copenhagen, Denmark
Berklee College of Music, Boston, Massachusetts
Black Artists Group, St. Louis, Missouri

I 
Institute of Jazz Studies, Newark, New Jersey
International Association for Jazz Education (IAJE), Manhattan, Kansas
International Jazz Festivals Organization

J 
Jazz at Lincoln Center, New York City, New York
Jazz Bridge, Philadelphia, Pennsylvania
Jazz Foundation of America, New York City, New York
Jazz House Kids, Montclair, New Jersey
Jazz Institute of Chicago, Chicago, Illinois
Jazz Interactions, New York City, New York
Jazz Loft Project, University of Arizona and Duke University
Jazz on the Square, Woodstock, Illinois
Jazzmobile, New York City, New York
Jazzschool, Berkeley, California
John W. Coltrane Cultural Society, Philadelphia, Pennsylvania

L 
Left Bank Jazz Society, Baltimore, Maryland
Louis Armstrong House, Corona, Queens, New York

M 
Manchester Craftsmen's Guild/MCG Jazz, Pittsburgh, Pennsylvania

N 
National Orchestra Service, Omaha, Nebraska
New Orleans Jazz National Historical Park, New Orleans, Louisiana
The New School for Jazz and Contemporary Music, New York City, New York

O 
Oklahoma Jazz Hall of Fame, Tulsa, Oklahoma

S 
Stanford Jazz Workshop, Stanford, California

T 
Thelonious Monk Institute of Jazz, Washington, D.C.; Los Angeles, California; and New Orleans, Louisiana
Tomorrow's Warriors, London, UK

See also
Timeline of jazz education

 
 
Lists of music organizations
Institutions